Alfonso Pedraza Sag (born 9 April 1996) is a Spanish professional footballer who plays for Villarreal. Primilarly a winger, he can also operate as a left-back. 

Formed at Villarreal, he went on to play as a senior for that club as well as Lugo, Leeds United, Alavés and Betis.

Club career
Born in San Sebastián de los Ballesteros, Córdoba, Andalusia, Pedraza joined Villarreal CF's youth setup in 2011 at the age of 15, after starting out at Séneca CF. In January 2015, he was promoted to the former's C team in Tercera División.

Pedraza made his senior debut on 11 January 2015, appearing as a second-half substitute for the reserves in a 2–2 away draw against CF Reus Deportiu in the Segunda División B championship. He scored his first goal on 1 March, the game's only in a home victory over CD Atlético Baleares.

On 5 April 2015, after being already a regular with the B's and being called up to the main squad by manager Marcelino García Toral, Pedraza made his professional – and La Liga – debut, replacing Jonathan dos Santos in the 72nd minute of a 0–0 draw at Valencia CF. On 28 July 2016, he was loaned to Segunda División side CD Lugo for one year, scoring his first professional goal on 21 August by netting the first in a 2–2 away draw with Gimnàstic de Tarragona. He ended the season with six successful strikes and eight assists, helping to a final ninth position.

On 31 January 2017, Pedraza joined Leeds United on loan until the end of the campaign, with Villarreal paying Lugo £300,000 in order to cancel his contract with them – the deal with the English side included an option to buy for £8.5 million in May, provided they won promotion from the EFL Championship. After featuring from the bench in his debut, a 2–1 loss at Huddersfield Town, he scored his first goal on 3 March in a 3–1 away win over Birmingham City; as the team could only rank seventh, he returned to the Estadio de la Cerámica.

On 5 July 2017, still owned by Villarreal, Pedraza signed with Deportivo Alavés for one year with a buyout clause. He scored his first goal in the Spanish top flight on 21 January 2018, putting the hosts ahead 2–0 in an eventual 2–2 home draw against CD Leganés.

Upon returning from loan, Pedraza was regularly deployed as a left back by manager Javier Calleja, and was definitely included in Villarreal's first team. On 4 November 2018, he scored his first goal for the club to earn a 1–1 home draw against Levante UD in local derby. The following 14 February, he scored the only goal after three minutes in a win at Sporting CP in the last 32 of the UEFA Europa League.

On 16 July 2019, Pedraza moved to fellow league team Real Betis on a one-year loan, with an option to make the deal permanent at the end of the season. From December to March, he suffered from muscular and Achilles tendon injuries. His only goal for the Seville-based side came on 8 July 2020 in a 3–0 home win over CA Osasuna that ensured another season in the top flight; on 24 September he extended his contract until 2025, after having his role in the team guaranteed by new manager Unai Emery.

International career
In 2015, Pedraza was part of the Spain under-19 squad that won the UEFA European Championship. He earned his first cap for the under-21s on 24 March 2016 of the following year, coming on for Dani Ceballos early in the second half of an eventual 0–3 home loss against Croatia in the 2017 European Championship qualifiers.

Style of play
Pedraza played mainly as a left winger, but could also operate on the opposite flank cutting inside or as a forward. His style of play was compared to Gareth Bale due to his speed running with the ball, as well as his strength and ability to take on defenders.

Spanish football expert Guillem Balagué described Pedraza upon signing for Leeds: "It’s one of the most exciting transfers of the winter... He’s a 20-year-old, he mirrors himself on Denis Cheryshev – a winger who goes forward and works really hard. And he’s a goalscorer".

Career statistics

Club

Honours
Villarreal
UEFA Europa League: 2020–21

Spain U19
UEFA European Under-19 Championship: 2015

Spain U21
UEFA European Under-21 Championship: 2019

Individual
UEFA Europa League Squad of the Season: 2020–21

References

External links

1996 births
Living people
Sportspeople from the Province of Córdoba (Spain)
Spanish footballers
Footballers from Andalusia
Association football defenders
Association football wingers
La Liga players
Segunda División players
Segunda División B players
Tercera División players
Villarreal CF C players
Villarreal CF B players
Villarreal CF players
CD Lugo players
Deportivo Alavés players
Real Betis players
English Football League players
Leeds United F.C. players
UEFA Europa League winning players
Spain youth international footballers
Spain under-21 international footballers
Spanish expatriate footballers
Expatriate footballers in England
Spanish expatriate sportspeople in England